The Attorney General of the State of Michigan is the fourth-ranking official in the U.S. state of Michigan. The officeholder is elected statewide in the November general election alongside the governor, lieutenant governor, secretary of state, members of the Senate and members of the House of Representatives.

Since the Michigan Constitution of 1963 was adopted, the attorney general has served a term of four years. The officeholder is also limited to two terms, for a total of eight possible years of service; ten possible years of service if the officeholder serves two full terms and less than half of one term as a replacement.

Inasmuch as the office of Attorney General has common law powers as the chief law enforcement officer of the State, he may exercise the powers of a peace officer and may appoint special agents having this status to assist him in enforcing his powers and carrying out his functions (AG Opinion No. 5236,10/20/1977).

Michigan law, MCL 14.32, provides that "[i]t shall be the duty of the attorney general, when required, to give his opinion upon all questions of law submitted to him by the legislature, or by either branch thereof, or by the governor, auditor general, treasurer or any other state officer . . . ."

Michigan's current attorney general is Democrat Dana Nessel, who was elected in November 2018, and sworn into office on January 1, 2019.

Courtesy title
The attorney general traditionally receives the courtesy title of The Honorable for life.

List of Attorneys General of Michigan

Source: Michigan Manual 2003-2004, Chapter IV, Former Officials of Michigan

External links

 Michigan Attorney General official website
 Michigan Attorney General articles at ABA Journal
 News and Commentary at FindLaw
 Michigan Compiled Laws at Law.Justia.com
 U.S. Supreme Court Opinions - "Cases with title containing: State of Michigan" at FindLaw
 State Bar of Michigan
 Michigan Attorney General Dana Nessel profile at National Association of Attorneys General
 Press releases at Michigan Attorney General

 
1837 establishments in Michigan